Van Buren High School may refer to several schools in the United States:

Van Buren High School (Van Buren, Arkansas)
Van Buren High School, Van Buren, Indiana
Van Buren High School (Van Buren, Maine)
Van Buren High School (Missouri) in Van Buren, Missouri
Martin Van Buren High School in Queens Village, New York City
Van Buren High School (Ohio) in Van Buren, Ohio